Darwin railway station is the terminus station of the Adelaide-Darwin rail corridor in the Darwin suburb of East Arm, Northern Territory. Since this area is not raised, small platforms with stairs are positioned for passengers.

History
The station opened on 4 February 2004 when The Ghan operated the first passenger service on the newly constructed line from Alice Springs.

In 2004, a small 0-4-0 steam locomotive, built in 1886 by Baldwin Locomotive Works, was put on display in the station. As the first locomotive in the Northern Territory, it was used during construction of the Palmerston and Pine Creek Railway and for 63 years more on the line. It became known as Sandfly. In 2008 the NT Motor Vehicle Enthusiasts Club substantially refurbished it for display, and since 2010 it has been in the former Qantas hangar in Parap alongside the club's historic trucks, traction and stationary engines and fire engines.

Services
The sole passenger services to Darwin are provided by The Ghan, which  operated weekly in each direction.

References

External links

Railway stations in the Northern Territory
Railway stations in Australia opened in 2004
Transport in Darwin, Northern Territory